Shcha (Щ щ; italics: Щ щ), Shta or Sha with descender is a letter of the Cyrillic script. In Ukrainian and Rusyn, it represents the consonant cluster , something like cash-chest. In Bulgarian, it represents the consonant cluster . Other non-Slavic languages written in Cyrillic use this letter to spell the few loanwords that use it or foreign names; it is usually pronounced  and is often omitted when teaching those languages.

English-speaking learners of Russian are often instructed to pronounce it in this way although it is no longer the standard pronunciation in Russian (it still is in Ukrainian and Rusyn, as above). The letter Щ in Russian and Ukrainian corresponds to ШЧ in related words in Belarusian.

History
The Cyrillic letter Shcha was derived from the Glagolitic letter Shta .

This letter was also used in Komi  (harder than ч), which is now represented by the digraph тш.

Form
The form of the letter Shcha is the letter Cyrillic Sha (Ш ш) with a descender (cf. the Cyrillic letters De (Д д), Tse (Ц ц), 
Ka with descender (Қ қ), and En with descender (Ң ң).

Related letters and other similar characters
Ш ш : Cyrillic letter Sha
С́ с́ : Montenegrin Cyrillic letter Sje
Ŝ ŝ : Latin letter Ŝ
Ś ś : Latin letter Ś

Computing codes

See also
 Mama ŠČ!
 Transliteration table for romanization of Russian, provides versions  (note circumflex vs. caron/háček in ),

References

External links